The Mochi Gate locally known as Mochi Darwaza  (موچی دروازہ) located in south of the Walled City of Lahore between Akbari and the Shah Alam Gates in Lahore, Punjab, Pakistan. It is one of the thirteen gates of the Walled City of Lahore which were built during the reign of the Mughal Emperor Akbar and were connected with a thirty feet high fortified wall for guarding the city. The gates were demolished during the British rule but were again constructed in early 1900s but during the riots of 1947 some gates were burnt down and some were demolished, Mochi Gate was one of them. The structure of the gate does not exist now but the streets, mohallah and buildings of high architectural value can still be seen in its streets.

There are several traditions associated with the name of this very gate. According to some historians, it is named after Moti, a guard of the gate during the Mughal era, who guarded and looked after the gate all his life. On the other hand however most historians agree that “Mochi” is the marred form of Urdu word “Morchi” which means “Trench Soldier”. The Governor's "Piada" units used to be stationed here. This origin of its name is further supported by the fact that the different streets (mohallas) inside this gate still bear their old names like Mohalla Teer-garan (arrow craftsmen), Mohalla Kaman-garan (bow craftsmen). 

The bazaar around the Mochi gate is renowned for its shops of Dried fruit, kites and fireworks. Mochi Gate is also known for ancient Mosque of Muhammad Saleh Kamboh, teacher of Mughal Emperor Aurangzeb. Further inside is the Mohalla Shia, where the traditional Shia of Lahore still gather annually, at Moharram (first lunar month of the Islamic calendar) to carry out the Majaalis (Shia religious gatherings) and Maatum (self chest beating) to commemorate the martyrdom of Imam Hussain, the grandson of the Islamic prophet Muhammad.  A number of Imaam Bargahs in the form of Haveli's are situated here. Apart from their religious significance, some are a masterpiece depicting the architecture of their times. Mubarak Haveli, Nisar Haveli and Laal Haveli are, but a few examples. A Kebab Shop (Saeein Kabab wala), a sweet mart (Fazal Sweets and Rafiq Sweets) and an Old Khoo (water well)(Lal Khoo) are some of the well known features of Mohalla Shia. In front of the Laal Haveli is the Mochi Baagh. This, until recently, was a lush green patch with shady trees, it is barren now due to its landscaping to become a "speaker's corner" in the light of its history of it having numerous renowned political leaders addressing the crowds at this place. Now this garden (baagh) is used for wedding ceremonies by locals and for playing cricket by the local boys.

Mochi Baagh
Mochi Baagh/Garden (موچی باغ) is Pakistan's most famous political rally spot. Mochi Baagh is located on the immediate right of Mochi Gate. Many renowned political leaders of Pakistan and the pre-independence era have delivered speeches here.

Until the late 1980s, it was commonly held that unless a politician could deliver a speech to a packed Mochi Baagh crowd s/he was not worth his/her political salt. 

Currently, Mochi Baagh has been spoiled by the right half of it being encroached upon by heavy duty truck drivers using it as a parking stand in violation of public area laws.

In March 2007, the PHA (Parks and Horticultural Authority) announced that maintenance works would be carried out in Mochi Baagh. Works proposed include the construction of a 27x33 (feet) stage, maintenance of stairs around the park, setting up of fountains, jogging tracks, the installation of benches and lights and the planting of grass.

In popular culture 
 In response to the opposition chanting slogans in the Pakistan assembly, the speaker Chaudhry Amir Hussain said “This is no Mochi Gate, Such slogans should not be raised in the assembly,”.
 It is said that it was a Pakistani from Lahore’s Mochi Gate who first taught the London policeman what a bribe meant.

See also 
 Lahore
 Lahore Fort
 Muhammad Saleh Kamboh
 Walled City of Lahore
 Badshahi Mosque

References

External links

 Mochi Gate and the lost Barkat Ali Islamia Hall Daily Times Retrieved March 6, 2021
 A Detailed Guide to Mochi Gate
 A Brief Guide to Mochi Gate
 Lal Khoo
 Visit of Lahore

Gates of Lahore